The Great Spectacular is a self-produced demo album by the Dixie Dregs, recorded in 1975 on campus at University of Miami and released in 1976 only on limited vinyl. By the time the band had risen in popularity in the late 1970s, the record had been out of print, becoming a highly sought-after collector's item, and was re-released for the CD format in 1997.

Overview
Eight of the songs from this album were re-recorded for the Dixie Dregs' future releases. The first three tracks ("Refried Funky Chicken", "Holiday" and "Wages of Weirdness") were re-recorded on their debut album Free Fall, while "Ice Cakes" and "What If" were re-recorded for What If, "Country House Shuffle" and "Leprechaun Promenade" for Night of the Living Dregs, and "The Great Spectacular" for Dregs of the Earth. "T.O. Witcher" was featured during Morse's time with Kansas on the album In the Spirit of Things. "Kathreen" hasn't appeared elsewhere.

On the making of The Great Spectacular, guitarist and bandleader Steve Morse recalled:

Track listing
All tracks composed by Steve Morse
"Refried Funky Chicken" – 3:50
"Holiday" – 3:55
"Wages of Weirdness" – 3:54
"T.O. Witcher" – 2:12
"The Great Spectacular" – 3:16
"Ice Cakes" – 3:46
"Leprechaun Promenade" – 3:19
"Country House Shuffle" – 3:59
"What If" – 3:28
"Kathreen" – 2:50

Personnel
Dixie Dregs:
Rod Morgenstein – drums
Steve Morse – guitars
Allen Sloan – violin
Andy West – bass guitar
Frank Josephs – electric piano

References

External links
 [ The Dixie Dregs @ Allmusic]

1976 debut albums
Dixie Dregs albums
Demo albums
Self-released albums